Christian Polig (born 22 December 1966) is an Italian former alpine skier who won the Europa Cup overall title in 1990.

Although he is also from Sterzing, he is not a relative of the other Italian skier Josef Polig.

Career
His skiing career had its peak in the two-year period 1990-92 where in addition to the titles in the Europa Cup and a top ten result in the World Cup, in 1991 he also achieved a 2nd place in slalom at the Italian championships.

World Cup results
Top 10

Europa Cup results
Polig has won an overall Europa Cup and one discipline cup.

FIS Alpine Ski Europa Cup
Overall: 1990
Slalom: 1990

References

External links
 

1966 births
Living people
Italian male alpine skiers
Germanophone Italian people
Sportspeople from Sterzing
Alpine skiers of Centro Sportivo Carabinieri
Italian alpine skiing coaches